C.E. Weber was a German type foundry established in 1827 in Stuttgart. Noted designers working for the foundry included Georg Trump, and Ernst Schneidler. The foundry closed in 1970; some designs passed to the Johannes Wagner Type Foundry, others to Stempel.

Typefaces
Foundry types produced by C.E. Weber:

References

Letterpress font foundries of Germany
Manufacturing companies based in Stuttgart
Companies established in 1827